Jaron Zepel Lanier (born May 3, 1960) is an American computer scientist, visual artist, computer philosophy writer, technologist, futurist, and composer of contemporary classical music. Considered a founder of the field of virtual reality, Lanier and Thomas G. Zimmerman left Atari in 1985 to found VPL Research, Inc., the first company to sell VR goggles and wired gloves. In the late 1990s, Lanier worked on applications for Internet2, and in the 2000s, he was a visiting scholar at Silicon Graphics and various universities. In 2006 he began to work at Microsoft, and from 2009 has worked at Microsoft Research as an Interdisciplinary Scientist.

Lanier has composed contemporary classical music and is a collector of rare instruments (of which he owns one to two thousand); his acoustic album, Instruments of Change (1994) features Asian wind and string instruments such as the khene mouth organ, the suling flute, and the sitar-like esraj. Lanier teamed with Mario Grigorov to compose the soundtrack to the documentary film The Third Wave (2007).

In 2005, Foreign Policy named Lanier as one of the top 100 Public Intellectuals. In 2010, Lanier was named to the TIME 100 list of most influential people. In 2014, Prospect named Lanier one of the top 50 World Thinkers. In 2018, Wired named Lanier one of the top 25 most influential people over the last 25 years of technological history.

Early life and education
Born Jaron Zepel Lanier in New York City, Lanier was raised in Mesilla, New Mexico. Lanier's mother and father were Jewish; his mother was a Nazi concentration camp survivor from Vienna, and his father's family had emigrated from Ukraine to escape the pogroms. When he was nine years old, his mother was killed in a car accident. He lived in tents for an extended period with his father before embarking on a seven-year project to build a geodesic dome home that he helped design.

At the age of 13, Lanier convinced New Mexico State University to let him enroll. At NMSU, he took graduate-level courses; he received a grant from the National Science Foundation to study mathematical notation, which led him to learn computer programming.

From 1979 to 1980, Lanier's NSF-funded project at NMSU focused on "digital graphical simulations for learning". Lanier also attended art school in New York during this time, but returned to New Mexico and worked as an assistant to a midwife. The father of a baby he helped deliver gave him a car as a gift, which Lanier later drove to Santa Cruz.

Atari Labs, VPL Research (1983–1990)
In California, Lanier worked for Atari Inc., where he met Thomas Zimmerman, inventor of the data glove. After Atari was split into two companies in 1984, Lanier became unemployed. The free time enabled him to concentrate on his own projects, including VPL, a "post-symbolic" visual programming language. Along with Zimmerman, Lanier founded VPL Research, focusing on commercializing virtual reality technologies; the company prospered for a while, but filed for bankruptcy in 1990. In 1999, Sun Microsystems bought VPL's virtual reality and graphics-related patents.

Internet2, visiting scholar (1997–2001)
From 1997 to 2001, Lanier was the Chief Scientist of Advanced Network and Services, which contained the Engineering Office of Internet2, and served as the Lead Scientist of the 'National Tele-immersion Initiative', a coalition of research universities studying advanced applications for Internet2. The Initiative demonstrated the first prototypes of tele-immersion in 2000 after a three-year development period. From 2001 to 2004, he was visiting scientist at Silicon Graphics Inc., where he developed solutions to core problems in telepresence and tele-immersion. He was also visiting scholar with the Department of Computer Science at Columbia University (1997–2001), a visiting artist with New York University's Interactive Telecommunications Program, and a founding member of the International Institute for Evolution and the Brain.

Family
Jaron Lanier and his wife, Lena, have one child, a daughter.

Selected list of works in prose

"One-Half of a Manifesto" (2000) 

In "One-Half a Manifesto", Lanier criticizes the claims made by writers such as Ray Kurzweil, and opposes the prospect of so-called "cybernetic totalism", which is "a cataclysm brought on when computers become ultra-intelligent masters of matter and life." Lanier's position is that humans may not be considered to be biological computers, i.e., they may not be compared to digital computers in any proper sense, and it is very unlikely that humans could be generally replaced by computers easily in a few decades, even economically. While transistor count increases according to Moore's law, overall performance rises only very slowly. According to Lanier, this is because human productivity in developing software increases only slightly, and software becomes more bloated and remains as error-prone as it ever was. "Simply put, software just won't allow it. Code can't keep up with processing power now, and it never will."
At the end he warns that the biggest problem of any theory (esp. ideology) is not that it is false, "but when it claims to be the sole and utterly complete path to understanding life and reality." The impression of objective necessity paralyzes the ability of humans to walk out of or to fight the paradigm and causes the self-fulfilling destiny which spoils people.

Post-symbolic communication (2006)
Some of Lanier's speculation involves what he calls "post-symbolic communication". In his April 2006 Discover magazine column, he writes about cephalopods (i.e., the various species of octopus, squid, and related molluscs), many of which are able to morph their bodies, including changing the pigmentation and texture of their skin, as well as forming complex shape imitations with their limbs. Lanier sees this behavior, especially as exchanged between two octopodes, as a direct behavioral expression of thought.

Wikipedia and the omniscience of collective wisdom (2006)
In his online essay "Digital Maoism: The Hazards of the New Online Collectivism", in Edge magazine in May 2006, Lanier criticized the sometimes-claimed omniscience of collective wisdom (including examples such as the Wikipedia article about him, which he said recurrently exaggerates his film directing work), describing it as "digital Maoism". He writes "If we start to believe that the Internet itself is an entity that has something to say, we're devaluing those people [creating the content] and making ourselves into idiots."

His criticism aims at several targets that concern him and are at different levels of abstraction:
 any attempt to create one final authoritative bottleneck that channels the knowledge onto society is wrong, regardless whether it is a Wikipedia or any algorithmically created system producing meta information,
 it creates a false sense of authority behind the information,
 a sterile style of wiki writing is undesirable because:
 it removes the touch with the real author of original information, it filters the subtlety of the opinions of the author, essential information (for example, the graphical context of original sources) is lost,
 collective authorship tends to produce or align to mainstream or organizational beliefs,
 he worries that collectively created works may be manipulated behind the scenes by anonymous groups of editors who bear no visible responsibility,
 and that this kind of activity might create future totalitarian systems as these are basically grounded on misbehaved collectives that oppress individuals.

This critique is further explored in an interview with him on Radio National's The Philosopher's Zone, where he is critical of the denatured effect that "removes the scent of people".

In December 2006 Lanier followed up his critique of the collective wisdom with an article in Edge entitled "Beware the Online Collective".
Lanier writes:

I wonder if some aspect of human nature evolved in the context of competing packs. We might be genetically wired to be vulnerable to the lure of the mob... What's to stop an online mass of anonymous but connected people from suddenly turning into a mean mob, just like masses of people have time and time again in the history of every human culture? It's amazing that details in the design of online software can bring out such varied potentials in human behavior. It's time to think about that power on a moral basis.

Lanier argues that the search for deeper information in any area sooner or later requires finding information that has been produced by a single person, or a few devoted individuals: "You have to have a chance to sense personality in order for language to have its full meaning." That is, he sees limitations in the utility of an encyclopedia produced by only partially interested third parties as a form of communication.

You Are Not a Gadget (2010) 

In his book You Are Not a Gadget (2010), Lanier criticizes what he perceives as the hive mind of Web 2.0 (wisdom of the crowd) and describes the open source and open content expropriation of intellectual production as a form of "Digital Maoism". Lanier accuses Web 2.0 developments of devaluing progress and innovation, as well as glorifying the collective at the expense of the individual. He criticizes Wikipedia and Linux as examples of this problem; Wikipedia for what he sees as: its "mob rule" by anonymous editors, the weakness of its non-scientific content, and its bullying of experts.

Lanier also argues that there are limitations to certain aspects of the open source and content movement in that they lack the ability to create anything truly new and innovative. For example, Lanier argues that the open source movement did not create the iPhone. In another example, Lanier further accuses Web 2.0 of making search engines lazy, destroying the potential of innovative websites such as Thinkquest, and hampering the communication of ideas such as mathematics to a wider audience.

Lanier further argues that the open source approach has destroyed opportunities for the middle class to finance content creation, and results in the concentration of wealth in a few individuals—"the lords of the clouds"—people who, more by virtue of luck rather than true innovation, manage to insert themselves as content concentrators at strategic times and locations in the cloud. In the book, Lanier also criticizes the MIDI Standard for musical instrument commonality.

Who Owns the Future? (2013) 

In his book Who Owns the Future? (2013), Lanier posits that the middle class is increasingly disenfranchised from online economies. By convincing users to give away valuable information about themselves in exchange for free services, firms can accrue large amounts of data at virtually no cost. Lanier calls these firms "Siren Servers", alluding to the Sirens of Ulysses. Instead of paying each individual for their contribution to the data pool, the Siren Servers concentrate wealth in the hands of the few who control the data centers.

For example, he points to Google's translation algorithm, which amalgamates previous translations uploaded by people online, giving the user its best guess. The people behind the source translations receive no payment for their work, while Google profits from increased ad visibility as a powerful Siren Server. In another example, Lanier points out that in 1988, Kodak employed 140,000 people when it led the digital imaging industry. By 2012, Kodak had filed for bankruptcy due to free photo-sharing sites such as Instagram that employed only 13 people at the time.

As a solution to these problems, Lanier puts forth an alternative structure to the web based on Ted Nelson's Project Xanadu. He proposes a two-way linking system that would point to the source of any piece of information, creating an economy of micropayments that compensates people for original material they post to the web.

Dawn of the New Everything (2017) 
In his book Dawn of the New Everything: Encounters with Reality and Virtual Reality (2017), Lanier reflects on his upbringing in 1960s New Mexico, his lifelong relationship with technology, and his path to Silicon Valley. Part personal memoir and part rumination on virtual reality, Lanier highlights VR's versatility both in historical context and projects its functions into the future.

Lanier writes of VR's capacity to engage and inspire more than any other kind of technology ("TV and video games draw people into a zombielike trance ... while VR is active and makes you tired after a while"). He writes that the older, poorer VR equipment might have done an even better job at exposing one's own process of perception, since "the best enjoyment of VR includes not really being convinced. Like when you go to a magic show." And he underscores how VR inherently helps the user focus on reality, rather than the virtual world, explaining that the best magic of VR happens in the moments right after the demo ends (his lab would often present flowers to visitors coming out of the headset, as the visitor would experience them as though for the first time).

Lanier cites modern VR's rich résumé beyond gaming and entertainment: it has been used to treat war veterans overcoming PTSD; by doctors to perform intricate surgeries; by paraplegics wanting to feel the sense of flight; and as a mechanism to prototype almost every vehicle fabricated in the last two decades. Throughout the book Lanier intersperses fifty-one definitions of VR, illuminating its many uses, gifts, and pitfalls.

Ten Arguments for Deleting Your Social Media Accounts Right Now (2018) 
As the name implies, Lanier is concerned about the influence of social media, and many of his criticisms of social media will feel familiar to observers of American politics and culture. In essence the claim is that platforms such as Twitter and Facebook have made their users cruder, less empathetic, more tribal. Lanier worries that reliance on social media platforms is reducing people's capacity for spirituality, and that social media users are in essence turning into automated extensions of the platforms.

Assessment of the Internet
Lanier asserts that the Internet mirrors the contemporary culture accurately,  
The Internet has created the most precise mirror of people as a whole that we've yet had. It is not a summary prepared by a social scientist or an elite think tank. It is not the hagiography of an era, condensed by a romantic idealist or a sneering cynic. It is the real us, available for direct inspection for the first time. Our collective window shades are now open. We see the mundanity, the avarice, the ugliness, the perversity, the loneliness, the love, the inspiration, the serendipity, and the tenderness that manifest in humanity. Seen in proportion, we can breathe a sigh of relief. We are basically OK.

Music

As a musician, Lanier has been active in the world of contemporary classical music, sometimes known as "new classical", since the late 1970s. He is a pianist and a specialist in many non-western musical instruments, especially the wind and string instruments of Asia. He maintains one of the largest and most varied collections of actively-played rare instruments in the world. Lanier has performed with artists as diverse as Philip Glass, Ornette Coleman, George Clinton, Vernon Reid, Terry Riley, Duncan Sheik, Pauline Oliveros, and Stanley Jordan. Recording projects include his acoustic techno duet with Sean Lennon and an album of duets with flutist Robert Dick.

Lanier also writes chamber and orchestral music. Current commissions include an opera that will premiere in Busan, South Korea, and a symphony, Symphony for Amelia, premiered by the Bach Festival Society Orchestra and Choir in Winter Park, Florida, in October 2010. Recent commissions include "Earthquake!" a ballet that premiered at the Yerba Buena Center for the Arts in San Francisco in April 2006; "Little Shimmers" for the TroMetrik ensemble, which premiered at ODC in San Francisco in April 2006; "Daredevil" for the ArrayMusic chamber ensemble, which premiered in Toronto in 2006; A concert-length sequence of works for orchestra and virtual worlds (including "Canons for Wroclaw", "Khaenoncerto", "The Egg", and others) celebrating the 1000th birthday of the city of Wroclaw, Poland, premiered in 2000; A triple concerto, "The Navigator Tree", commissioned by the National Endowment for the Arts and the American Composers Forum, premiered in 2000; and "Mirror/Storm", a symphony commissioned by the St. Paul Chamber Orchestra, which premiered in 1998. Continental Harmony was a PBS special that documented the development and premiere of "The Navigator Tree" won a CINE Golden Eagle Award.

In 1994, he released the contemporary classical music album Instruments of Change on POINT Music/Philips/PolyGram Records. The album has been described by Stephen Hill, on "The Crane Flies West 2" (episode 357) of Hearts of Space, as a Western exploration of Asian musical traditions. Lanier is currently working on a book, Technology and the Future of the Human Soul, and a music album, Proof of Consciousness, in collaboration with Mark Deutsch.

Lanier's work with Asian instruments can be heard extensively on the soundtrack of Three Seasons (1999), which was the first film ever to win both the Audience and Grand Jury awards at the Sundance Film Festival. He and Mario Grigorov scored a film entitled The Third Wave, which premiered at Sundance in 2007. He is working with Terry Riley on a collaborative opera to be entitled Bastard, the First.

Lanier has also pioneered the use of Virtual Reality in musical stage performance with his band Chromatophoria, which has toured around the world as a headline act in venues such as the Montreux Jazz Festival. He plays virtual instruments and uses real instruments to guide events in virtual worlds. In October 2010, Lanier collaborated with Rollins College and John V. Sinclair's Bach Festival Choir and Orchestra  for his Worldwide Premiere of "Symphony for Amelia".

Lanier contributed the afterword to Sound Unbound: Sampling Digital Music and Culture (MIT Press, 2008) edited by Paul D. Miller, a.k.a. DJ Spooky.

On May 9, 1999, Lanier authored a New York Times opinion piece entitled "Piracy is Your Friend" in which he argued that the record labels were a much bigger threat to artists than piracy. The original article is no longer available, but an excerpt entitled "Making an Ally of Piracy" exists with the same date. The original article is quoted in a separate New York Times article by Neil Strauss, also with the same date. On November 20, 2007, he published a mea culpa sequel entitled "Pay Me for My Content", again in The New York Times.

Memberships
Lanier has served on numerous advisory boards, including the Board of Councilors of the University of Southern California, Medical Media Systems (a medical visualization spin-off company associated with Dartmouth College), for the Microdisplay Corporation, and for NY3D (developers of auto stereo displays).

In 1997, he was a founding member of the 'National Tele-Immersion Initiative', an effort devoted to using computer technology to give people who are separated by great distances the illusion that they are physically together. Lanier is a member of the Global Business Network, part of the Monitor Group.

In the media
He has appeared in several documentaries, including the 1990 documentary Cyberpunk, 1992 Danish television documentary Computerbilleder – udfordring til virkeligheden (in English: Computer Pictures - A Challenge to Reality), the 1995 documentary Synthetic Pleasures, the 2004 television documentary Rage Against the Machines, and the 2020 Netflix documentary The Social Dilemma. Lanier was credited as one of the miscellaneous crew for the 2002 film Minority Report. Lanier stated that his role was to help make up the gadgets and scenarios. Lanier has appeared on The Colbert Report, Charlie Rose, and The Tavis Smiley Show. He appeared on ABC's The View during the final seven minutes of the show on 19 June 2018, promoting his book Ten Arguments For Deleting Your Social Media Accounts Right Now. He was a guest on the Radiolab podcast episode "The Cataclysm Sentence", released on 18 April 2020. Lanier was interviewed by Andrew Yang in the "Yang Speaks" podcast, episode entitled "Who owns your data? Jaron Lanier has the answer" on May 28, 2020. Lanier appeared on the Lex Fridman podcast on September 6, 2021 to talk about his views on AI, social media, VR and the future of humanity. He has had speaking engagments and presentations at Concordia University Wisconsin and University Temple United Methodist Church.

Awards 
 Jill Watson Festival Across the Arts Wats:on? Award in 2001
 Finalist for the first Edge of Computation Award in 2005
 Honorary doctorate from New Jersey Institute of Technology in 2006 
 IEEE Virtual Reality Career Award in 2009
 Named one of Time magazine's Time 100, one of the most influential thinkers in 2010
 Honorary doctorate from Franklin and Marshall College in 2012
Awarded the Goldsmith Book Prize for best trade book in 2014
 Peace Prize of the German Book Trade in 2014

Works

Western classical music
Instruments of Change (1994), POINT Music/Philips/PolyGram Records

Video games
Alien Garden (Atari 800, 1982, with designer Bernie DeKoven)
Moondust (C64, 1983)

Books
 Information Is an Alienated Experience, Basic Books, 2006, 
You Are Not a Gadget: A Manifesto, New York : Alfred A. Knopf, 2010, 
Who Owns the Future?, San Jose : Simon & Schuster, UK : Allen Lane, 2013, 
Dawn of the New Everything: Encounters with Reality and Virtual Reality, New York: Henry Holt and Co., 2017, 
Ten Arguments for Deleting Your Social Media Accounts Right Now, New York: Henry Holt and Co., 2018,

References

Further reading
 (Smithsonian often changes the title of a print article when it is published online. This article is titled "What turned Jaron Lanier against the web?" online.)

External links

Video discussion with Lanier involving intelligence (and AI) with Eliezer Yudkowsky on Bloggingheads.tv

21st-century American scientists
21st-century American non-fiction writers
American computer scientists
Artificial intelligence researchers
Virtual reality pioneers
American consciousness researchers and theorists
Contemporary classical music performers
American multi-instrumentalists
American classical composers
21st-century American composers
21st-century classical composers
American film score composers
American male film score composers
Futurologists
Wired (magazine) people
Guzheng players
Computer graphics researchers
Silicon Graphics people
Columbia University faculty
Dartmouth College faculty
University of California, Berkeley people
Critics of Wikipedia
Video game developers
American transhumanists
Internet theorists
Hacker culture
Musicians from New York City
Scientists from New York City
Writers from New York City
American people of Austrian-Jewish descent
American people of Ukrainian-Jewish descent
1960 births
Living people
21st-century American male musicians